The Oostvaardersplassen is a nature reserve in the Netherlands, managed by the Staatsbosbeheer (state forestry service). It is in a polder created in 1968; by 1989, its ecological interest had resulted in its being declared a Ramsar wetland. It became part of Nieuw Land National Park when that was established in 2018.

Geography 
The Oostvaardersplassen are located in the municipality of Lelystad, between the towns of Lelystad and Almere, in the province of Flevoland in the Netherlands. The Oostvaardersplassen can be divided into a wet area in the northwest and a dry area in the southeast.

Wet and dry areas 

In the wet area along the Markermeer, there are large reedbeds on clay, where moulting geese often feed. This area is also home to great cormorant, common spoonbill, great egret, white-tailed eagle and Eurasian bittern, among many other animals. Oostvaardersplassen is a Special Protection Area for birdlife.

Before the establishment of the reserve, the dry area was a nursery for willow trees, and in the first year hundreds of seedlings could be found on each square metre. This led to concern that a dense woodland would develop, significantly reducing the value of the habitat for water birds. To avoid this, the park's managers brought in a number of large herbivores to keep the area more open, including Konik ponies, red deer and Heck cattle. These large grazing animals are kept out in the open all year round without supplemental feeding for the winter and early spring, and are allowed to behave as wild animals (without, for example, for now, castrating males).  The ecosystem developing under their influence is thought to resemble those that would have existed on European river banks and deltas before human disturbance.  However, there is some controversy about how natural the ecosystem is, as it lacks top predators.

Large herbivores 

Before they were driven to extinction, large herbivores in this part of Europe included the tarpan (wild horse), wisent (European bison), red deer and aurochs (wild cattle). The tarpan and aurochs are extinct, but Konik ponies and Heck cattle are able to act as functional equivalents, occupying a similar ecological niche. The only native large herbivores now missing from Oostvaardersplassen are the elk (Alces alces), the wild boar and the wisent. There is a chance that the wild boar will find its way naturally from the Veluwe.

Management 
The reserve is the subject of decades of management reports and protests against the large reported number of grazers dying by starvation or shot to death, while the animals are kept behind a fence and cannot migrate. 
During a particularly harsh winter in 2005, many animals in the Oostvaardersplassen died of starvation, leading to public outcry against alleged animal cruelty and leading to the culling strategy. In the winter of 2017–2018, almost 3.300 deer, horses and cattle starved to death dividing the Dutch public and leading to demonstrations and individuals feeding hay to the animals despite police arrests.

The Province asked the Van Geel Commission to write a policy which was presented in April and approved on 11 July 2018. This Van Geel report advised to manage the terrain instead of rewilding. The consequence is a reduction of the numbers of remaining animals either by replacing or shooting which led to another outburst of protests and court cases.

Mass mortalities were likely also caused by failure to connect the reserve to the Veluwe nearby due to conflicts with farmers and a lack of political support, abandonment of  due to political transition, and failure to introduce large predators.

Future development 
In many ways the Oostvaardersplassen is an isolated area; it is in a polder and there are currently no corridors connecting it to other nature reserves. The "Ecological Main Structure" plan proposes connections between nature reserves in the Netherlands, calling for a corridor to be created toward nearby . The resulting network, called Oostvaardersland, would be part of Natura 2000, the European-wide network of habitats to which Oostvaardersplassen belongs. The creation of Oostvaardersland will allow seasonal small scale migration and take some strain off the big grazers in winter. In the summer, Oostvaardersplassen will offer rich grazing and the sea winds will keep biting insects at bay, in the winter, the Horsterwold will offer protection from cold winds and supply browse. Furthermore, there is an option for a connection to the Veluwe forest. Eventually this could allow wild animals to move to and from Germany.

Oostvaardersland was expected to be finished by 2014. However, the project ran into financial and political troubles. The government then planned to sell back the property to the previous owners for less money than it originally paid for the property; according to European nature laws it would then have to turn other lands into wilderness areas to compensate for the loss of the Oostvaarderswold nature area. 

As above-mentioned, the plan to connect to the veluwe in Gelderland also failed.

See also
De Nieuwe Wildernis, a 2013 Dutch natural history documentary film 
Pleistocene Park
Wood-pasture hypothesis

References

External links

  Oostvaardersplassen at the website of Staatsbosbeheer

Birdwatching sites in the Netherlands
Ecological experiments
Geography of Flevoland
Important Bird Areas of the Netherlands
Lelystad
Nature reserves in the Netherlands
Ramsar sites in the Netherlands
Rewilding
Special Protection Areas in the Netherlands
Tourist attractions in Flevoland
Natura 2000 in the Netherlands